The 1908 Newfoundland general election was held on 2 November 1908 to elect members of the 21st General Assembly of Newfoundland in the Dominion of Newfoundland. The seats were split evenly between the Liberal Party and the new Newfoundland People's Party formed by Edward Morris after he resigned from the Liberal government in 1907 and joined with the opposition. Robert Bond, the Liberal leader, asked the Governor William MacGregor to dissolve the assembly. MacGregor refused to do this and Bond resigned as Premier. The Governor asked Edward P. Morris to form a government. The assembly was not able to elect a speaker and, after the Governor was unable to convince the two party leaders to form a coalition government, the house of assembly was dissolved on April 9, 1909.

Seat totals

Members elected

 Bay de Verde
 John Crosbie People's Party
 Jesse Whiteway People's Party
 Bonavista Bay
 Sydney Blandford People's Party
 William C. Winsor People's Party
 Donald Morison People's Party
 Burgeo-LaPoile
 Robert Moulton People's Party
 Burin
 Edward H. Davey Liberal
 Henry Gear, Liberal
 Carbonear
 Joseph Maddick Liberal
 Ferryland
 Michael P. Cashin People's Party
 William J. Ellis Liberal
 Fogo
 Henry Earle Liberal
 Fortune Bay
 Charles Emerson People's Party
 Harbour Grace
 A. W. Piccott People's Party
 Edward Parsons People's Party
 Eli Dawe Liberal
 Harbour Main
 William Woodford People's Party
 J. J. Murphy People's Party
 Placentia and St. Mary's
 Edward M. Jackman Liberal
 Michael S. Sullivan Liberal
 J. Davis Liberal
 Port de Grave
 William R. Warren People's Party
 St. Barbe
 William M. Clapp Liberal
 St. George's
 Joseph F. Downey People's Party
 St. John's East
 James M. Kent Liberal
 George Shea Liberal
 J. Dwyer Liberal
 St. John's West
 Edward P. Morris People's Party
 John R. Bennett People's Party
 Michael Kennedy People's Party
 Trinity Bay
 George W. Gushue Liberal
 A. W. Miller Liberal
 Robert Watson People's Party
 Twillingate
 Robert Bond Liberal
 James A. Clift Liberal
 George Roberts Liberal

References 
 

1908
1908 elections in North America
1908 elections in Canada
Politics of the Dominion of Newfoundland
1908 in Newfoundland
November 1908 events